"Keep the Fire Burnin'" is a song by REO Speedwagon from their 1982 album Good Trouble.  This single was the only track from the Good Trouble album to make the top ten on the pop charts, cresting at number seven.

Background
It is also the only tune from the album to feature Kevin Cronin on keyboards (piano), which, although primarily the band's lead singer and acoustic/rhythm guitarist, he had begun using (in the studio) on the You Can Tune a Piano, but You Can't Tuna Fish album.

This is the only song from the band's Good Trouble album to have been performed live in its entirety following its supporting tour in 1983. Despite that fact, however, it is still a significant rarity in the band's setlists that has only been performed a handful of times over the last 35 years. As recently as March 2020, Kevin Cronin has played the song during solo acoustic sets during REO concerts. In addition, it is also for unknown reasons the only one of the band's major hit singles that was not included on their compilation album The Hits.

Reception
Cash Box said that "the song isn't much different from a lot of the band's material since 'Roll With The Changes' and it's just a tad more melodic and uplifting than 'Don't Let Him Go.'"  Billboard said that "urgent uptempo rhythms, surging organ and vaulting vocals all continue the platinum style perfected on Hi Infidelity."

Personnel
REO Speedwagon
 Kevin Cronin – lead vocals, backing vocals, acoustic piano, acoustic guitar
 Gary Richrath – electric guitar
 Neal Doughty – organ
 Bruce Hall – bass
 Alan Gratzer – drums

Additional personnel
 Tom Kelly – backing vocals
 Richard Page – backing vocals

Charts

Weekly charts

Year-end charts

References

1982 singles
REO Speedwagon songs
Songs written by Kevin Cronin
1982 songs
Epic Records singles
Song recordings produced by Kevin Beamish
Song recordings produced by Gary Richrath
Song recordings produced by Kevin Cronin